Joseph or Joe Mullaney may refer to:

Joe Mullaney (rugby league) (born 1934), English rugby league footballer 
Joe Mullaney (basketball) (1924–2000), American basketball player and coach
Joe Mullaney (actor) (born 1962), Scottish actor
Joe Mullaney Jr., coach of St. John's Red Storm women's basketball 1984–1996